Parapercis albiventer, the whitebelly sandperch, is a fish species in the sandperch family, Pinguipedidae. It is found in the Western Indian Ocean, from Madagascar, southern Mozambique, Zanzibar and South Africa. 
This species can reach a length of  TL.

References

Pinguipedidae
Taxa named by Hans Hsuan-Ching Ho
Taxa named by Phillip C. Heemstra
Taxa named by Hisashi Imamura
Fish described in 2014